Gorla is a district ("quartiere") of Milan, Italy. It is part of the Zone 2 administrative division, located north-east of the city centre. Before 1923, Gorla was an independent comune. The name "Gorla" is probably derived from the latin word gulula, meaning "little cleft".

The district is traversed by Viale Monza, a major thoroughfare connecting Milan and Monza, as well as the Naviglio Martesana canal. The most prominent architectural feature of Gorla consists in a number of 19th Century villas that were built along the Naviglio Martesana and served as country residences for rich Milanese families.

History
Gorla developed as a rural settlement until the late 19th century. Thereafter, the Milanese north-east quickly turned into an industrial area (most notably around Sesto San Giovanni), a process that affected Gorla as well. In 1864, Gorla became a formal "comune", named "Gorla Primo"; in 1920 Gorla and the bordering comune of Precotto merged into the new comune of Gorlaprecotto, a decision that was intended to preserve both comunes from being absorbed into Milan. Nevertheless, three years later, Gorlaprecotto was annexed to the city along with other 12 comunes.

The Little Martyrs of Gorla
During World War II, on 20 October 1944, Gorla was the scene of a dramatic bombing by the Allies. The bombing was allegedly intended to strike industrial structures, but the bombing group went off course due to a misinterpretation of the brief, even if the weather was exceptionally clear. Their commander, the U.S. then colonel James B. Knapp (1915 - 1999), upon realizing the mistake, decided to release the bombs on the town instead. Most victims were civilians, and one of the bombs hit a school, killing 184 children. The victims are now remembered as "the Little Martyrs of Gorla", and a memorial was built where the killing had taken place; a museum dedicated to peace has also been established in the area. The U.S. military never apologized for killing innocents due to their mistakes and  inappropriate decisions.

Footnotes

Districts of Milan
Former municipalities of Lombardy